Coptotriche kenyensis is a moth of the  family Tischeriidae. It is found in Kenya.

References

Mey, 2010. Two new species of Tischeriidae from East Africa (Lepidoptera, Tischerioidea). Esperiana  Memoir 5: 337

Endemic moths of Kenya
Moths described in 2010
Tischeriidae
Moths of Africa